Josu Mirena Andueza Zabaleta (born 5 June 1973) is a Spanish rower. He competed in the men's eight event at the 1992 Summer Olympics.

References

External links
 

1973 births
Living people
Spanish male rowers
Olympic rowers of Spain
Rowers at the 1992 Summer Olympics
People from Errenteria
Sportspeople from Gipuzkoa
Rowers from the Basque Country (autonomous community)